Stratton is a statutory town in Kit Carson County, Colorado, United States. The population was 658 at the 2010 census. Stratton was named in honor of the gold miner and philanthropist Winfield Scott Stratton.

Geography
Stratton is located at  (39.302976, -102.604272).

Climate

Demographics

As of the census of 2000, there were 669 people, 287 households, and 189 families residing in the town. The racial makeup of the town was 96.86% White, 0.45% Native American, 0.15% Asian, 1.94% from other races, and 0.60% from two or more races. Hispanic or Latino of any race were 3.59% of the population.

There were 287 households, out of which 30.3% had children under the age of 18 living with them, 57.1% were married couples living together, 4.5% had a female householder with no husband present, and 34.1% were non-families. 30.0% of all households were made up of individuals, and 15.7% had someone living alone who was 65 years of age or older.  The average household size was 2.31 and the average family size was 2.92. In the town, the population was spread out, with 25.3% under the age of 18, 7.0% from 18 to 24, 26.0% from 25 to 44, 23.5% from 45 to 64, and 18.2% who were 65 years of age or older.  The median age was 40 years. For every 100 females, there were 97.9 males.  For every 100 females age 18 and over, there were 97.6 males.

The median income for a household in the town was $32,500, and the median income for a family was $36,964. Males had a median income of $31,875 versus $17,857 for females. The per capita income for the town was $15,428.  About 7.0% of families and 9.4% of the population were below the poverty line, including 12.8% of those under age 18 and 9.4% of those age 65 or over.

The community is served by Stratton Senior High School.

Major roads
 Interstate 70
 U.S. Highway 24

See also

 List of municipalities in Colorado

References

External links

 Town of Stratton website
 CDOT map of the Town of Stratton

Towns in Kit Carson County, Colorado
Towns in Colorado